Alan Fields (29 March 1914 – 21 February 1998) was an Australian rules footballer who played with Fitzroy in the Victorian Football League (VFL) during the 1940s.

Fields was a defender and debuted in 1939, appearing for the club 19 times in his first two seasons before missing the 1941, 1942 and 1943 seasons as he was serving in World War 2 in the 2nd/7th Australian Infantry Battalion. He returned in 1944 and won a premiership.

External links

2004 obituary of Maurie Hearn, mentioning Clen Denning and Laurie Bickerton as the surviving members of the Maroons' 1944 side

1914 births
Australian rules footballers from Victoria (Australia)
Fitzroy Football Club players
Fitzroy Football Club Premiership players
Warragul Football Club players
1998 deaths
One-time VFL/AFL Premiership players